Fred & Roxy were a British female vocal duo of Phaedra and Roxana Aslani, who released the hit single "Something for the Weekend" in May 1999. Recording commenced in 1998 with Trevor Steel and John Holliday, members of The Escape Club, at Air Studios in Hampstead. 

The sisters, daughters of the Iranian singer-songwriter Faramarz Aslani, recorded an album worth of material for the Echo label, part of the Chrysalis Group, where both sisters worked from 1995 to 1999. "Something for the Weekend", was the lead single from the intended album and featured remixes from The Almighty and Boy George.

The single entered the UK Singles Chart on 2 May 2000 at No. 36. The second single, like its predecessor, received a dance floor response in July 2000, with mixes from The Almighty. 'Ten Times More' was earmarked for release in August 2000 but was hampered by record company legal issues. The same fate befell Fred and Roxy's untitled debut album which was supposed to be released in September 2000.

References

External links
Official Singles Chart Top 100
BILLBOARD August 1999
BILLBOARD December 1999 "1999, the year in music"
Fred & Roxy discography
Echo Label
Almighty – Remixes

British pop music groups